Thopha is a genus of cicada native to Australia. Five species are recognised, the double drummer (Thopha saccata), the northern double drummer (T. sessiliba), the golden drummer (T. colorata), T. emmotti and T. hutchinsoni. Within sessiliba, two subspecies are recognized, the nominotypical form and T. sessiliba clamoris Moulds and Hill.

Genetic and morphological data show that Thopha is closely related to the genus Arunta; together they comprise the tribe Thophini.

References

Thophini
Insects of Australia
Cicadidae genera
Taxa named by Charles Jean-Baptiste Amyot
Taxa named by Jean Guillaume Audinet-Serville